Anisus vorticulus (lesser ramshorn snail or little whirlpool ramshorn snail) is a species of minute, air-breathing, freshwater snail, an aquatic gastropod mollusk in the family Planorbidae, the ramshorn snails.

Description
The shell lacks a keel and the peripheral angle is relatively prominent, with a slender, narrow periostracal fringe.

Distribution
Anisus vorticulus occurs in Czech Republic - critically endangered (CR). Its Conservation status in 2004–2006 is bad (U2) in report for European commission in accordance with Habitats Directive. England - vulnerable (VU), listed in List of endangered species in the British Isles. It is currently the focus of a Back from the Brink project. Ireland, Germany - critically endangered (vom Aussterben bedroht), Netherlands, Poland, Slovakia - critically enangered, Latvia and Croatia - in the Krka National Park. First finding of this species in Croatia was in 2009.

In the British Isles, this species is restricted to a small number of sites in the Norfolk Broads and the Pevensey Levels and Arun Valley in Sussex and Surrey.

Habitat 
This small snail lives in pools with standing water and in oxbow lakes, but these biotopes are threatened because of sedimentation and ecological succession. It favours ditches with much aquatic flora but little emergent vegetation. Invasive plants such as floating marsh pennywort, (Hydrocotyle ranunculouides), that sometimes chokes ditches, and the Himalayan balsam (Impatiens glandulifera) are particularly harmful.

This species often lives in places where there is abundant duckweed Lemna spp.. Water quality that is suitable for Anisus vorticulus is water without turbidity, with a high pH and a low level of nutrients. The main threats to this snail include land drainage, poor habitat management and eutrophication.

References

External links
Anisus vorticulus at Animalbase
 distribution of Anisus vorticulus at European Environment Agency webpage
  Anisus vorticulus and its distribution in the Czech Republic with map

Planorbidae
Gastropods described in 1834